Salvia can refer to:

 Salvia or sage, the plant genus, especially the species
 Salvia officinalis, a culinary herb
 Salvia divinorum, a psychoactive herb
Salvia (artist), a Welsh artist
 Salvia gens, an ancient Roman family
 Salvia, Virginia, a community in the United States
 Salvia, Liburnia, an ancient Illyrian settlement
 Savoia di Lucania, a municipality originally named Salvia
 , a Flower-class corvette of the Royal Navy during the Second World War
 , a  Iris-class buoy tender of the United States Coast Guard

See also
 Sage (disambiguation)